Laura De Neve (born 9 October 1994) is a Belgian footballer. She plays as a defender for Anderlecht and the Belgium women's national football team.

Club career 
De Neve started her career the Dender youth team. As from season 2012–13 she transferred to RSC Anderlecht. In 2012–13 she won with Anderlecht the Belgian Women's Cup. In season 2015–16 she played again in the final in the Cup but they lost against Lierse SK.

International career 
In 2016, she played for the Flames 3 games in the Algarve Cup in Portugal.

She was selected for the 2017 Cyprus Cup games. Because an injury in the competition with Anderlecht against Oud-Heverlee Leuven, therefore she had to forfeit the Cyprus Cup and was replaced by Sarah Wijnants in the selection.

In recent years she remained a regular choice in the senior team. De Neve was part of the squad at the Pinatar Cup 2022 in Spain, where Belgium won their very first trophy after defeating Russia in the final.

De Neve went on and represented Belgium at the UEFA Women's Euro 2022 and played 2 of the 3 group matches (against Iceland and France), and again in the quarter finals where they lost against Sweden.

Career statistics

International

References

External links
 
 
 

1994 births
Living people
Belgian women's footballers
Belgium women's international footballers
Women's association football defenders
Super League Vrouwenvoetbal players
RSC Anderlecht (women) players
UEFA Women's Euro 2022 players
UEFA Women's Euro 2017 players